Manoora is a suburb of Cairns in the Cairns Region, Queensland, Australia.

Geography 
Maroora is west of the Cairns city centre in Far North Queensland. It straddles the Cairns Western Arterial Road (state route 91).

History 
Manoora is situated in the Yidinji traditional Aboriginal country. 

The suburb was established in 1975 from part of Parramatta Park and all of the area known as West Cairns. It was named after HMAS Manoora, which was in turn named after the town of Manoora in South Australia. The ship was built in Scotland in 1935 as a coastal steamer for the Adelaide Steamship Company and regularly visited Cairns, and entered service with the Royal Australian Navy in the World War II.

Pau Enterprises Indigenous Corporation was established in 2015 to manage and maintain the Pau family native title lands and interests on Darnley Island. It also seeks to create social enterprises on Darnley Island and other locations where community members have migrated to, such as Cairns. Their Cairns initiatives are organised from their Manoora office.

In 2012, the Non-State Schools Accreditation Board approved the application for Holy Spirit College to establish as a special assistance school. Assisted by funding of $9 million from the Queensland Government, construction commenced on the two sites in Manoora and Cooktown in July 2014. The Manoora campus opened at the start of the 2015 school year in the partly-built campus, full completion not being expected until July 2015.

Education 
Holy Spirit College is a private secondary (7-12) campus of the Holy Spirit College headquartered at Cooktown. It is operated by Cairns Catholic Education Services. The Manoora campus is at 13 Moignard Street. The school is specifically to provide support for disengaged and marginalised young people. It offers enrolment as a day student at the Manoora campus, but there are also boarding options at the Cooktown campus.

There are no mainstream schools in Manoora. The nearest government primary schools are Cairns West State School in neighbouring Manunda to the south-east, Edge Hill State School in neighbouring Edge Hill to the north, and Whitfield State School in neighbouring Whitfield to the north-west. The nearest government secondary school is Trinity Bay State High School in neighbouring Manunda to the east.

Amenities 
Piccones Village is a shopping centre on Pease Street. It is operated by the Piccones family, a four-generation family of retailers in Cairns.

Pease Street contains the commercial centre in Manoora including a shopping centre, tavern and fast food franchise.

Attractions 
The Cairns Indigenous Art Centre is at 1 Jensen Street. It is operated by Umi Arts, an Indigenous organisation established in 2005, to preserve and protect the culture of Aboriginal and Torres Strait Islander people.

References

External links 

Suburbs of Cairns